Chen Yanqing (born May 4, 1979) is a Chinese weightlifter who competed in the 2004 Summer Olympics and the 2008 Summer Olympics. She won the gold medal in the 58 kg class in both competitions, making her the first woman to win gold medals in weightlifting in two consecutive Olympics.

Chen was born in Suzhou, Jiangsu. She won her first gold medal in 1995 at the Junior Asian Women Weightlifting Championship, and another at a 1998 world championship. She was slated to compete at the 2000 Summer Olympics but was scratched from the Chinese Olympic lineup for strategic reasons a short time before the games began. She has also won the National Games and East Asia Games and set the world record in her weight class in the snatch and lift in 2006.

Personal life
Chen was born to a poor rural family who live in a small farming village called Xishan on an island near Suzhou, two hours west of Shanghai. Her parents are both fruit growers. In 1989 her parents sent her to a state athletic school after coach and former weightlifter Cao Xinmin discovered her at a sports match in Suzhou. Her parents have mixed emotions about her career in weightlifting, but her earnings have helped raise her family's standard of living.

After she was scratched from the 2000 Summer Olympics, she retired in 2001 to study business at Soochow University in Suzhou. She returned from retirement to compete in the 2004 and 2008 Summer Olympics.

References

1979 births
Living people
Chinese female weightlifters
Olympic gold medalists for China
Olympic weightlifters of China
Sportspeople from Suzhou
Weightlifters at the 2004 Summer Olympics
Weightlifters at the 2008 Summer Olympics
World record holders in Olympic weightlifting
Olympic medalists in weightlifting
Asian Games medalists in weightlifting
Weightlifters at the 2006 Asian Games
Medalists at the 2008 Summer Olympics
Medalists at the 2004 Summer Olympics
Weightlifters at the 1998 Asian Games
Asian Games gold medalists for China
Weightlifters from Jiangsu
Medalists at the 1998 Asian Games
Medalists at the 2006 Asian Games
World Weightlifting Championships medalists
20th-century Chinese women
21st-century Chinese women